Norton David Zinder (November 7, 1928 – February 3, 2012) was an American biologist famous for his discovery of genetic transduction.  Zinder was born in New York City, received his A.B. from Columbia University in 1947, Ph.D. from the University of Wisconsin–Madison in 1952, and became a member of the National Academy of Sciences in 1969. He led a lab at Rockefeller University until shortly before his death.

In 1966 he was awarded the NAS Award in Molecular Biology from the National Academy of Sciences.

Genetic transduction and RNA bacteriophage

Working as a graduate student with Joshua Lederberg, Zinder discovered that a bacteriophage can carry genes from one bacterium to another.  Initial experiments were carried out using Salmonella.  Zinder and Lederberg named this process of genetic exchange transduction.

Later, Zinder discovered the first bacteriophage that contained RNA as its genetic material. At that time, Harvey Lodish (now of the Massachusetts Institute of Technology and Whitehead Institute for Biomedical Research) worked in his lab.

Norton Zinder died in 2012 of pneumonia after a long illness.

References

Further reading
Papers authored by Norton Zinder
Laboratory of Genetics at Rockefeller University
Historical plaque at UW–Madison noting Zinder's contribution to molecular genetics
Biography of Norton Zinder

1928 births
2012 deaths
American microbiologists
Rockefeller University faculty
The Bronx High School of Science alumni
University of Wisconsin–Madison alumni
Phage workers
Members of the United States National Academy of Sciences
Human Genome Project scientists
Scientists from New York City
Columbia College (New York) alumni